Central Elgin is a township located in Southwestern Ontario, Canada in Elgin County on Lake Erie. It is part of the London census metropolitan area.

History
Central Elgin was formed in 1998 through the amalgamation of the Township of Yarmouth with the Villages of Belmont and Port Stanley.

Communities
The municipality includes the population centres of Port Stanley and Belmont. Other communities include Dexter, Lawton's Corners, Lyndale, Lynhurst, Mapleton, New Sarum, Norman, Sparta, Union, Whites and Yarmouth Centre.

Mayors
 Bill Walters, 1999
 David M. Rock, 1999–2006
Born June 16, 1948, in St. Thomas, Ontario. He was also chair of the Elgin Group Police Services Board. While he was mayor, there were discussions about proposed new ferry services on Lake Erie and their financial implications.
 Sylvia Hofhuis, 2006–2010
 Tom Marks, 2010
 Bill Walters, 2010–2014
 David Marr, 2014–2018
 Sally Martyn, 2018–2022
 Andrew Sloan, 2022–

Demographics 

Education

The community of Sparta has a French-immersion public school. It was an English public school prior to fall 2018.

See also
List of townships in Ontario

References

External links

 

Lower-tier municipalities in Ontario
Municipalities in Elgin County